Buzzcocks are an English punk rock band formed in Bolton, England in 1976 by singer-songwriter-guitarist Pete Shelley and singer-songwriter Howard Devoto. They are regarded as a seminal influence on the Manchester music scene, the independent record label movement, punk rock, power pop, and pop punk. They achieved commercial success with singles that fused pop craftsmanship with rapid-fire punk energy. These singles were collected on Singles Going Steady, an acclaimed compilation album described by music journalist and critic, Ned Raggett, as a "punk masterpiece".

Devoto and Shelley chose the name "Buzzcocks" after reading the headline, "It's the Buzz, Cock!", in a review of the TV series Rock Follies in Time Out magazine. The "buzz" is the excitement of playing on stage; "cock" is northern English slang meaning "friend". They thought it captured the excitement of the nascent punk scene, as well as having humorous sexual connotations following Pete Shelley's time working in a Bolton adult shop.

Devoto left the band in 1977, after which Pete Shelley became the principal singer-songwriter. After releasing three albums, as well as Singles Going Steady, the band broke up in 1981 following a dispute with their then-record label, but reunited in 1989, since releasing six more albums. Shelley died in 2018, but the band has remained active. Steve Diggle, the guitarist and co-founder of the band, is now singer. They added a new guitarist Mani Perazzoli. They are still touring.

Career

Early years 
Howard Trafford, a student at Bolton Institute of Technology, placed a notice in the college looking for musicians sharing a liking for The Velvet Underground's song "Sister Ray". Peter McNeish, a fellow student at the institute, responded to the notice. Trafford had previously been involved in electronic music, while McNeish had played rock.

By late 1975, Trafford and McNeish had recruited a drummer and formed an embryonic version of what would become Buzzcocks. The band formed, officially, in February 1976; McNeish assumed the stage name Pete Shelley and Trafford named himself Howard Devoto. They performed live for the first time on 1 April 1976 at their college. Garth Davies played bass guitar and Mick Singleton played drums. Singleton also played in local band Black Cat Bone.

After reading an NME review of the Sex Pistols' first performance, Shelley and Devoto travelled to London together to see the Sex Pistols in February 1976. Shelley and Devoto were impressed by what they saw and arranged for the Sex Pistols to come and perform at the Lesser Free Trade Hall in Manchester, in June 1976. Buzzcocks intended to play at this concert, but the other musicians dropped out, and Shelley and Devoto were unable to recruit replacements in time for the gig. Once they had recruited bass guitarist Steve Diggle and drummer John Maher, they made their debut opening for the Sex Pistols' second Manchester concert in July 1976. A brief clip of Devoto-era Buzzcocks performing The Troggs' "I Can't Control Myself" appears in the Punk: Attitude documentary directed by Don Letts. In September 1976 the band travelled to London to perform at the two-day 100 Club Punk Festival, organised by Malcolm McLaren. Other performers included: the Sex Pistols, Subway Sect, Siouxsie and the Banshees, The Clash, The Vibrators, The Damned and the French band Stinky Toys.

By the end of the year, Buzzcocks had recorded and released a four-track EP, Spiral Scratch, on their own New Hormones label, making them one of the first punk groups to establish an independent record label, trailing only Fatal Records, created by The Saints to release "(I'm) Stranded". Produced by Martin Hannett, the music was roughly recorded, insistently repetitive, and energetic. "Boredom" announced punk's rebellion against the status quo while templating a strident musical minimalism (the guitar solo consisting of two repeated notes). The demos recorded while Devoto was in the band were later issued officially as Time's Up. Long available as a bootleg, this album includes the alternative takes of all the tracks from the Spiral Scratch EP as well as early version of tracks that later appeared on the official debut Another Music in a Different Kitchen.

After a few months, Devoto left the group, expressing his dissatisfaction at the direction that punk was taking in his statement: "I don’t like movements. What was once unhealthily fresh is now a clean old hat". He returned to college for a year, then formed Magazine. Pete Shelley took on the vocal duties; his high-pitched, melodic singing stood in stark contrast to the gruff pub rock vocal stylings of many punk contemporaries. Steve Diggle switched from bass to guitar, and Garth Davies (a.k.a. Garth Smith) rejoined on bass. While Davies appeared on the band's first Radio 1 Peel Session, in September 1977, his alleged unreliability led to his expulsion from the band. (He later joined New York band Dirty Looks.) Davies was replaced by Steve Garvey. This new line-up signed with United Artists Records – the signing itself was undertaken at Manchester's Electric Circus on 16 August 1977, the day Elvis Presley died.

Signing to United Artists 
Their first UA Buzzcocks single, "Orgasm Addict", was a playful examination of compulsive sexuality that was, and remains, uncommonly bold. The BBC refused to play the song, and the single did not sell well. Later, more ambiguous songs staked out a territory defined by Shelley's bisexuality and punk's aversion to serious examination of human sexuality. The next single, "What Do I Get?" reached the UK top 50 chart. "Lipstick", the B-side to "Promises," shared the same ascending progression of notes in its chorus as Magazine's first single, "Shot By Both Sides," also released in 1978.

A string of successful singles followed with their signature song, "Ever Fallen in Love (With Someone You Shouldn't've)" reaching number 12 in the UK charts in October 1978. Regular TV appearances and record releases kept their profile high and ensured their influence would remain.

Their original career produced three LPs: Another Music in a Different Kitchen, Love Bites, and A Different Kind of Tension, all of which made the UK Top Thirty. Their distinctive sound was a marriage of catchy pop melodies with punk guitar energy, backed by an unusually tight and skilled rhythm section. They advanced drastically in musical and lyrical sophistication: by the end they were quoting USA writer William S. Burroughs ("A Different Kind of Tension"), declaiming their catechism in the anthem "I Believe", and tuning in to a fantasy radio station on which their songs could be heard ("Radio Nine"). In September 1980, the double 'A' side "Why She's A Girl From The Chainstore/Are Everything" made the Top 75, their last charting single.

In parallel with Buzzcocks, Pete Shelley formed a more experimental and post-punk band, The Tiller Boys, along with Eric Random and Francis Cookson, while Steve Garvey joined The Teardrops in 1978, along with The Fall's Tony Friel and Karl Burns; both bands were releasing material in late 1970s and broke up at the same time as Buzzcocks.

Break-up and reunions 

After recording demos for a fourth album the group disbanded in 1981; Shelley took up a solo career. Diggle and Maher formed Flag of Convenience, and released several singles between 1982 and 1989. Garvey formed Motivation and joined Blue Orchids, moving to New York shortly afterwards to continue with the first band. Maher had joined Wah! by the time Buzzcocks broke up. Shelley and Devoto teamed up in 2002 for the first time since 1976, producing the album Buzzkunst, 'Kunst' being the German word for 'Art'. The album was a mix of electronic music and punk.

John Maher owns and runs John Maher Racing, a vintage Volkswagen performance tuning workshop on the Isle of Harris, Scotland.  He has built and raced several Volkswagen Beetles. In 2005, Shelley re-recorded "Ever Fallen in Love (With Someone You Shouldn't've)" with a group including Roger Daltrey, David Gilmour, Peter Hook, Elton John, Robert Plant and several contemporary bands, as a tribute to John Peel. Proceeds went to Amnesty International. Shelley also performed the song live, with Plant, Daltrey, Gilmour, Hook and Jeff Beck at the 2005 UK Music Hall of Fame.

Buzzcocks reformed several times after 1989, featuring Shelley and Diggle with other musicians; initially with Maher and Garvey for a world tour, then briefly replacing Maher with Smiths drummer Mike Joyce. In 1992, Tony Barber joined on bass and Phil Barker on drums. This line-up toured on one of Nirvana's last tours in 1994. Buzzcocks toured as support for Pearl Jam in 2003. In April 2006, Barker left and was replaced by Danny Farrant. In March 2006, the band released their eighth studio album, Flat-Pack Philosophy, on Cooking Vinyl Records, the supporting tour found them playing on a leg of the mid-2006 Vans Warped Tour. They made an appearance for Maxïmo Park's homecoming gig in Newcastle upon Tyne on 15 December 2007. In April 2008, Barber left and was replaced by Chris Remington.

In January 2009, the band embarked on a UK and European tour, the "Another Bites Tour", in which they played their first two albums in full, as well as an encore of their other hits.

In July 2009, Buzzcocks played in Serbia for the second time, at the EXIT festival in Novi Sad. Their song, "Why Can't I Touch It" was played in the second episode of the sixth season of TV series Entourage. On 9 November 2009, Buzzcocks gave a performance on a small balcony overlooking Dame Street in Dublin, for the music viral show BalconyTV.

In December 2009, they played as the main support act for The Courteeners. In August 2011, they headlined the first night of The Rhythm Festival in Bedfordshire. On 25 May 2012 in Manchester at the O2 Apollo and on 26 May in Brixton at the O2 Academy they performed with the original line-up, as well as the classic line-up of the band. It was announced on 26 May 2012 that, for the first time, they would headline Thursday night in the Empress Ballroom at the Rebellion Festival in Blackpool, sharing the stage with Rancid, Public Image Limited and Social Distortion.

On 1 May 2014, Buzzcocks released the album The Way via PledgeMusic. On 13 September 2014 they played "a brief but triumphant set" at Riot Fest 2014 in Chicago, Illinois, US. In October 2014 they toured the UK for three weeks with The Dollyrots as main support.

In 2016, the band embarked on their 40th-anniversary tour, "Buzzcocks 40". In 2017, "Why Can't I Touch It" was featured in the opening segment of the Telltale game 'Guardians of the Galaxy.

Shelley's death and aftermath 
Pete Shelley died on 6 December 2018 from a suspected heart attack at his home in Tallinn, Estonia.

In June 2019, Buzzcocks performed with several guest vocalists as a tribute to Shelley. The concert had been planned before his death. Steve Diggle said that Buzzcocks would continue, with the post-Shelley Buzzcocks being a 'new era'. Sonics in the Soul, the band's first album without Shelley, was released in September 2022. It featured Diggle on all vocals, and included a tribute to Shelley in the form of the track "You've Changed Everything Now".

Band members 

Current
 Steve Diggle – guitar, vocals (1977–81, 1989–present); bass (1976–77)
 Danny Farrant – drums (2006–present)
 Chris Remington – bass (2008–present)
 Mani Perazzoli - guitar (2019–present)

Former
 Pete Shelley – vocals, guitar (1976–81, 1989–2018; his death)
 Howard Devoto – lead vocals (1976–77, 2012)
 Garth Smith – bass (1976–77)
Mick Singleton – drums (1976)
 John Maher – drums (1976–81, 1989, 1992, 2012)
 Barry Adamson – bass (1977)
 Steve Garvey – bass (1977–81, 1989–92, 2012)
 Mike Joyce – drums (1990–91)
Steve Gibson – drums (1992)
 Tony Barber – bass (1992–2008)
Phil Barker – drums (1992–2006)

Timeline

Never Mind the Buzzcocks 
Buzzcocks' name was combined with the title of the Sex Pistols album Never Mind the Bollocks to create the title of the long-running UK comedy TV panel game show Never Mind the Buzzcocks. Diggle claimed in his autobiography that he and Shelley had only granted the BBC use of their name under the impression that it would be a one-off, probably unsuccessful pilot, and that they are now mildly disgruntled that the name is more readily associated in Britain with the TV series than with their band. Shelley himself appeared on the programme in 2000, where host Mark Lamarr introduced Shelley by saying that without Buzzcocks 'there'd be no Smiths or Radiohead, and this show would be called Never Mind Joan Armatrading!'"

Discography 

 Studio albums

 Another Music in a Different Kitchen (1978)
 Love Bites (1978)
 A Different Kind of Tension (1979)
 Trade Test Transmissions (1993)
 All Set (1996)
 Modern (1999)
 Buzzcocks (2003)
 Flat-Pack Philosophy (2006)
 The Way (2014)
 Sonics in the Soul (2022)

References

External links 

 
 

 
1976 establishments in England
English punk rock groups
English new wave musical groups
English pop punk groups
English power pop groups
United Artists Records artists
I.R.S. Records artists
Parlophone artists
Musicians from the Metropolitan Borough of Bolton
Musical groups established in 1976
Musical groups disestablished in 1981
Musical groups reestablished in 1989
Musical groups from Greater Manchester
Musical groups from Lancashire
ROIR artists
Merge Records artists
Domino Recording Company artists